is a Japanese manga artist, born in Urawa, Saitama Prefecture (now part of Saitama City). She graduated from Saitama Prefecture's prestigious Urawanishi High School and Hosei University's department of psychology, with a major in sports psychology. During her high school days, she was a member of her school's softball team, which would go on to be an inspiration in her work Ōkiku Furikabutte as well as her high school which is featured in detail (the school now advertising the manga and anime on their website).

In 1998, Higuchi won noted seinen manga magazine Afternoon'''s Shiki competition with her work Yuku tokoro. It was noted for the unique relationships shared by its characters  and was subsequently published in the August issue of the magazine, thus marking her debut as a manga artist. She is currently working on Ōkiku Furikabutte, which has spanned 32 volumes to date and being serialized in the monthly Afternoon. It won the 10th Tezuka Osamu Cultural Prize for best creative work in 2006, and the 31st Kodansha Manga Award for general manga in 2007.

 Works 
 Yuku tokoro (1998)
 Kazoku no Sore Kara (2000, serialized in Afternoon, Kodansha)
 Yasashii Watashi (2001–2002, serialized in Afternoon, Kodansha)
 Ōkiku Furikabutte (2004–present, serialized in Afternoon'', Kodansha)

References

External links 
 

Japanese female comics artists
Female comics writers
Women manga artists
Manga artists from Saitama Prefecture
Living people
1970 births
Hosei University alumni
20th-century Japanese women writers
20th-century Japanese writers
21st-century Japanese women writers
21st-century Japanese writers